Handball at the 1972 Summer Olympics was the second appearance of the sport at the Olympics, returning to the Olympic program after a 36-year absence. The competition was for men only and it was contested by sixteen teams.

The teams were split into four groups of four teams each.  Each team played every other team in its group.

The lowest team in group A played the lowest in group B while the lowest in groups C and D played each other.  The winners of those games played each other for 13th and 14th places, while the losers played each other for 15th and 16th.

The third-ranked teams in groups A and B also played each, as did those in groups C and D.  Again, the winners of those games played each other, this time for 9th and 10th places.  The losers played for 11th and 12th places.

The top two teams in each group advanced to the main round.  Those from groups A and B became group I while those from groups C and D became group II.  Another round-robin was played within those groups, with the results from the preliminary round carrying over.

The fourth-ranked teams in each of the two main round groups played each other for 7th and 8th place. The third-ranked teams played against each other for 5th and 6th place. The second-ranked teams played for the bronze medal and 4th place. The top teams in group I and group II played each other for the gold and silver medals.

Medallists

Qualification

Results

Preliminary round

Group A

Group B

Group C

Group D

Classification round

Bracket

9th place bracket

13th place bracket

13–16th place semifinals

9–12th place semifinals

15th place game

13th place game

Eleventh place game

Ninth place game

Main round

Group I

Group II

Final round

Seventh place game

Fifth place game

Bronze medal game

Gold medal game

Rankings and statistics

Final ranking

Top goalscorers

Participating nations
Each country was allowed to enter a team of 16 players and they all were eligible for participation. Japan entered only a squad of twelve.

A total of 242(*) handball players from 16 nations competed at the Munich Games:

 
 
 
 
 
 
 
 
 
 
 
 
 
 
 
 

(*) NOTE: There are only players counted, which participated in one game at least.

Not all reserve players are known.

Team rosters

References

External links
International Olympic Committee results database

1972 Summer Olympics events
1972
1972 in handball